The Sulzfluh is a mountain in the Rätikon range of the Alps, located on the border between Austria and Switzerland. The closest locality is St. Antönien, on the southern side.

It is well known by climbers and has a Via ferrata on the southern, Swiss face, in Graubünden. There are a total of  six known caves into the limestone mountain, with lengths between 800 and 3000 or more yards, with all entrances on the Eastern side, in Switzerland.

The eastern side has a mountain path of grade T4,  allowing non-climbers to reach the 2817 metre summit.  This is part of a multi day walking route along the entire length of the Rätikon chain on the sunnier side, called "Prättigauer Höhenweg".

References

External links

 Sulzfluh on Hikr
 Sulzfluh on Summitpost

Mountains of the Alps
Mountains of Switzerland
Mountains of Vorarlberg
Austria–Switzerland border
International mountains of Europe
Mountains of Graubünden
Two-thousanders of Switzerland
Luzein